Bromopentaamminecobalt(III) bromide is the dibromide salt of the cobalt coordination compound with the formula [Co(NH3)5Br]2+.  It is a purple, water-soluble solid.  The analogous chloropentaamminecobalt(III) chloride is also well known.

Synthesis and reactions
The title compound is prepared by oxidation of a solution of cobalt(II) salts in aqueous ammonia.

2 CoBr2  +  8 NH3  +  2 NH4Br  +  H2O2   →    2 [Co(NH3)5Br]Br2  +  2 H2O

It was first reported in the 1870s, before the structure or even formulae were understood for such complexes.  This early work showed that only two thirds of the bromide groups were exchangeable with other anions such as nitrate and dithionate.

The complex undergoes aquation, meaning that bromide is displaced by water:

[Co(NH3)5Br]Br2  +  H2O  →    [Co(NH3)5(H2O)]Br3

This process is catalyzed by platinum.

References

Further reading
Loehlin, James H. "The Study of a Cobalt Complex-A Laboratory Project." Journal of Chemical Education.  

Bromides
Cobalt complexes
Cobalt(III) compounds
Ammine complexes
Bromo complexes